Mălina is a Romanian female given name. Notable people with the name include:

Mălina Călugăreanu (born 1996), Romanian fencer
Mălina Olinescu (1974–2011), Romanian singer

See also
Molina (surname)

Romanian feminine given names